The terruqueo is a negative campaigning and often racist method of fearmongering used in Peru that involves describing anti-Fujimorists, left-wing political opponents and those who are against the neoliberal status quo as terrorists or terrorist sympathizers, with the tactic primarily being used by right-wing parties, especially among Fujimorists. United Nations experts have condemned the use of the terruqueo, describing it as an intimidation tactic used by the government.

Etymology 
The term terruqueo is derived from the word terruco, or "terrorist" in English, a neologism which originated from individuals in Ayacucho describing Shining Path guerrillas during the internal conflict in Peru. Historian Carlos Aguire said that the -uco replaced the ending of the word terrorista by Quechua speakers since they typically terminate words with -uco. Since the 1980s, the word terruco has been carelessly used by right-wing politicians in Peru to target left-wing, progressive and indigenous groups, with this baseless and often racist attack being called a terruqueo.

History

20th century 
Terruqueos began to appear during the 1980s and would occur throughout Peru's internal conflict. The basis of the terruqueo began during the presidency of Fernando Belaúnde when Legislative Decree 46 broadly defined terrorism as "any form of glorification or defense of the political discourse of subversive organizations".

Fujimori government 
Into the 1990s, authoritarian president Alberto Fujimori utilized terruqueos to discredit those who opposed him, with political scientist Daniel Encinas saying that this would evolve into conservative politicians using the attack to target those opposed to Fujimori's neoliberal economic policies and that the right-wing used the terruqueo as a "strategy of manipulating the legacy of political violence". Following the 1992 Peruvian self-coup, Fujimori would broaden the definition of terrorism in an effort to criminalize as many actions possible to persecute left-wing political opponents. 

Discussing Fujimori's actions, Dr. Fernando Velásquez Villalba states:
Thus, using the terruqueo, according to Velásquez Villalba, Fujimori made himself a "permanent hero" and made left-wing ideologies an eternal enemy.

21st century 
The terruqueo would then become so prominent that political discussions in Peru often devolved into the attacks, especially during elections. When Ollanta Humala, who initially espoused a left-wing ideology, was involved in Peruvian politics, opponents used the terruqueo against him. The attack evolved into linking left-wing groups with Hugo Chávez and chavismo as the crisis in Venezuela began to unfold in the 2010s.

2020 Peruvian protests 

During the 2020 Peruvian protests against Manuel Merino, protesters whose motives were originally praised by the media were described as terrucos when they began to make labor rights demands. Congresswoman Martha Chávez of the Fujimorist Popular Force party described protesters as "vandals and extremists, undoubtedly linked to Shining Path or MRTA". The protests, fueled by younger individuals who were not influenced by conservative governments and the armed forces were not affected by the terruqueo since they did not hold fearful memories from the historical conflict, with demonstrators often chanting "they messed with the wrong generation".

2021 Peruvian elections 

The terruqueo attacks became even more frequent during the 2021 Peruvian general election when Daniel Urresti described Verónika Mendoza as "Terrónika" and supporters of Keiko Fujimori, daughter of Alberto Fujimori, attempted to link Pedro Castillo to terrorists. Even center-right political parties such as the Purple Party (Partido Morado) were described as "Moradef", likening the party to MOVADEF. 

Terruqueos were most intense against Castillo; he was portrayed as a "communist threat" that would bring "terrorism" and humanitarian disaster similar to Venezuela. Media organizations in Peru would use the terruqueo along with fake news in an effort to support Fujimori. The Guardian described links to guerrilla groups such as the Shining Path as "incorrect", and the Associated Press said that allegations by Peruvian media of links to Shining Path were "unsupported". Conservative politician Rafael López Aliaga would reportedly call for death in two separate incidents; in May 2021 he allegedly chanted "Death to communism! Death to Cerrón! Death to Castillo!" to supporters and at the Respect My Vote rally that was organized by Willax TV owner Erasmo Wong Lu on 26 June 2021, he supposedly stated "Death to communism, get out of here, filthy communists, you have awakened the lion, to the streets!"

2022–2023 Peruvian political protests 

When the 2022–2023 Peruvian political protests occurred, right-wing groups and the government of Dina Boluarte used the terruqueo to label protesters as terrorists, providing an excuse for authorities to use violence with impunity. Experts of the United Nations condemned its usage during the protests.

Analysis 
Analysts believe that terruqueos are detrimental to democracy in Peru as they suppress ideas of various political groups and occasionally target human rights groups, promoting political polarization and ultimately political violence. United Nations experts condemned the tactic, saying it was an act of intimidation that stigmatized human rights workers, indigenous individuals and rural groups. According to Dr. Fernando Velásquez Villalba, terruqueos are a latent phenomenon that appear more frequently in times of crisis. The attacks have also resulted in less support for left-wing groups in Peru, with Americas Quarterly writing that despite the Truth and Reconciliation Commission finding that left-wing groups distanced themselves and even prevented violence during the internal conflict, the groups were still seen disapprovingly in Peru. During the protests in 2023, Edgar Stuardo Ralón, Vice President of the Inter-American Commission on Human Rights (IACHR), stated that terruqueos created "an environment of permission and tolerance towards discrimination, stigmatization and institutional violence".

See also 
 Chilezuela
 Red Scare
 McCarthyism
 Moral panic
 Scapegoating
 Witch-hunt

References 

Politics of Peru
Terrorism in Peru